"Hårgalåten", or the "Harga song", is a Swedish folk song. The song is connected to a 1785 story published by Johan Gabriel Lindstrom. The song describes how a mysterious fiddler came to the community near  or "Harga mountain", and played the fiddle. The youth danced to the tune that the fiddler played and they were unable to stop. Some of the youth noticed a cloven hoof, leading them to believe the fiddler was demonic. Even as morning came, the adults noticed they were all still dancing, and the fiddler still fiddling. Later, the dancers started dropping dead from exhaustion.

References

External links
 

Swedish folk songs
Songs about fiddles